Amer Khan (born 21 February 1981 in Sheffield) is a  light heavyweight boxer based in Sheffield, England. He was a National Amateur champion and an undefeated former Central Area light heavyweight champion.

Professional Boxing Career
Khan made his debut in 2003, however was largely inactive, making infrequent appearance. Khan beat Darren Stubs to become the BBBofC Central Area light heavyweight champion in 2006, and has been inactive since 2007.

Outside boxing
He has previously helped in raising funds for the Kashmir earthquake. Outside of boxing, he was an ambulance driver. He is currently a full-time fireman and a boxing trainer at the Ingle boxing club where he has trained since he was 13 years old.

References

External links
 
 Amer Khan Profile at BritishBoxing.net

1981 births
Living people
Sportspeople from Sheffield
English male boxers
Light-heavyweight boxers
English people of Pakistani descent
British sportspeople of Pakistani descent